Bernard Zalmon Agrons (July 13, 1922 – October 16, 2015) was an American politician who was a member of the Oregon House of Representatives. He served from 1983 to 1991 as a Democrat. Born in Philadelphia, Agrons attended the University of California, Berkeley studying forestry and also served in the United States Army Signal Corps. He was married to Elizabeth Josephine (Betty Jo) Arnold from July 21, 1946, until her death on May 11, 2009.

References

1922 births
2015 deaths
Democratic Party members of the Oregon House of Representatives
Politicians from Klamath Falls, Oregon
UC Berkeley College of Natural Resources alumni
United States Army soldiers
Politicians from Philadelphia